Hotaling is a surname. Notable people with the surname include:

 John Hotaling (1824–1886), American soldier, engineer, and businessman
 Anson Parsons Hotaling (1827-1900), American businessman
 Pete Hotaling (1856–1928), American center fielder in Major League Baseball
 Arthur Hotaling (1873–1938), American film director, producer and writer
 Frank Hotaling (1909–1977), American art director
 Norma Hotaling (1951–2008), American women's rights activist